Transition is the seventh studio album by Steve Lukather, released  on vinyl and as a jewel case CD on January 21, 2013, by Mascot Records. In Europe a limited edition Digibook was also released, containing a booklet with studio pictures and liner notes from Lukather and producer C. J. Vanston.

Track listing
 "Judgement Day" (Steve Lukather, C. J. Vanston) – 7:17
 "Creep Motel" (Lukather, Vanston, Fee Waybill) – 5:46
 "Once Again" (Lukather, Vanston) – 4:57
 "Right the Wrong" (Lukather, Vanston, Trev Lukather) – 6:20
 "Transition" (Lukather, Vanston, Steve Weingart) – 5:32
 "Last Man Standing" (Lukather, Randy Goodrum) – 5:21
 "Do I Stand Alone" (Lukather, Vanston) – 4:10
 "Rest of the World" (Jack Raines, Vanston) – 4:01
 "Smile" (Charlie Chaplin, arr. by Lukather, Weingart, Vanston) (Instrumental) – 2:30

Personnel 

 Steve Lukather – guitars, lead vocals (1-4, 6–8), lead guitar (5), backing vocals (5, 6, 7), arrangements
 Trevor  Lukather – muted guitar (4)
 C. J. Vanston – keyboards,  backing vocals (1-7), arrangements
 Steve Weingart – keyboards (5, 9), keyboard solo (5), arrangements (9)
 Leland Sklar – bass (1, 2), bass solo (1)
 Renee Jones – bass (3), backing vocals (8)
 John Pierce – bass (4, 6, 7)
 Tal Wilkenfeld – bass (5)
 Nathan East – bass (8)
 Toss Panos – drums (1, 3)
 Gregg Bissonette – drums (2, 5)
 Chad Smith – drums (4)
 Eric Valentine – drums (6, 7, 8)
 Lenny Castro – percussion (2, 3, 6, 8)
 Phil Collen – backing vocals (1)
 Jenny Douglas – backing vocals (2, 7)
 Kristina Helene – backing vocals (4)
 Richard Page – backing vocals (4, 6)
 Jack Raines – backing vocals (8)

Production 
 Steve Lukather – producer 
 CJ Vanston – producer, engineer, mixing, studio photography 
 Tina Lukather – assistant producer
 Ross Hogarth – bass and drum engineer 
 John Cranfield – assistant engineer
 Adrian Van Velsen – digital editing 
 Peter Doell – mastering 
 Universal Mastering Studios (Los Angeles, California) – mastering location 
 Roy Koch – graphic design, artwork 
 Rob Shanahan – photography

Charts

References

External links
 Album page on stevelukather.net

2013 albums
Steve Lukather albums